Hanns-Peter Boehm (9 January 1928 – 10 May 2022) was a German chemist and professor emeritus at Ludwig-Maximilians-Universität in Munich, Germany. Boehm is considered a pioneer of graphene research.

Biography 
Hanns-Peter Boehm studied chemistry in Regensburg from 1947 to 1951. He received his doctorate in 1953 at Technische Universität Darmstadt, where he also received his habilitation in 1959 with the treatise Oberflächenchemie und Adsorption an Kohlenstoff und SiO2. In 1961, Boehm, together with Ralph Setton and Eberhard Stumpp, isolated and identified single graphene sheets by transmission electron microscopy (TEM) and X-ray diffraction. In 1986 they authored the IUPAC (International Union of Pure and Applied Chemistry) report formally defining the term graphene. In 1970 Boehm became professor and director of the Institute for Inorganic Chemistry of Ludwig-Maximilians-Universität in Munich; in 1994 he retired to the status of professor emeritus.

References

External links
 
 

1928 births
2022 deaths
20th-century German chemists
Academic staff of the Ludwig Maximilian University of Munich
Technische Universität Darmstadt alumni
French people of German descent
French emigrants to Germany
Scientists from Paris